EdAid is a funding platform for higher education. EdAid partners with university and professional schools to defer tuition payment, interest-free.

History 
EdAid was founded by Tom Woolf (CEO), the former Mission Chief of JustGiving Middle East and Africa and Accenture Financial Services Strategy alumni. EdAid received regulatory approval from the Financial Conduct Authority (FCA; formerly the FSA) in February 2016 and was launched in March 2016.

Process 
EdAid lets students defer tuition fees, interest-free. 

Study now, pay later is the mechanism by which students from underrepresented communities can get fair, affordable access to higher education. 

EdAid ensures that students and their education provider have shared risk, shared reward model that builds greater level of equity into Higher Education.

EdAid is regulated by the Financial Conduct Authority and students are validated through a three-phase process that includes identity, fraud and AML checks before starting an application. Students must be on a UK, US, Canadian or Australian accredited course with the permanent right to remain in their country of study after graduation.

EdAid has offices in the United Kingdom, United States of America, Canada, Ireland, the United Arab Emirates and Australia. 

EdAid will fund 10,000 students in 2020, typically doubling household income for the students it funds.

Fees 
EdAid charges a technology and processing fee to the education provider and zero fees to the student. from successfully funded students which cover legal, regulatory, banking and administrative costs. Repayments are pegged to the rate of the Consumer Price Index without additional interest charges. Students will typically start to repay 10% of their monthly salary after they graduate and are in full-time employment, although EdAid also offers some regular payment plans on certain courses.

EdAid Foundation 
The EdAid Foundation is a UK-registered charity that provides matched funding from corporations, trusts, high net-worth individuals and alumni.

See also 
 Peer-to-peer lending
 Higher education
 Crowdfunding
 Student loans in the United Kingdom

References

External links 
 

Companies based in the London Borough of Islington
Crowdfunding platforms of the United Kingdom
Peer-to-peer lending companies
Financial services companies based in London